The Grand Som is a mountain of the Chartreuse Mountains in the French Prealps, in Isère, France. It has a long ridge, unevenly sharp, overlooking the Petit Som (1,772m), the Col de la Ruchère northwest and the Grande Chartreuse monastery below the cliffs. The summit has a cross and two relief tables. It lies in the Parc Naturel Régional de la Chartreuse.

Caving 
Discovered in July 1966 by the caving club of La Tronche (FLT), the siphon at (−688 m) was reached on August 23, 1967. Upper entries were then found.

References

Mountains of Isère
Mountains of the Alps
Chartreuse Mountains
Two-thousanders of France